Débora Bloch (born 29 May 1963) is a Brazilian actress. She is known nationally for participating in telenovelas such as Caminho das Índias, Cordel Encantado, and Avenida Brasil.

Biography 
Bloch was born in Belo Horizonte, Minas Gerais. She is daughter of actor Jonas Bloch, and is a descendant of Ukrainian Jewish immigrants.

Her contact with the performing arts began early, when, as a child, she and her sister accompanied their father to rehearsals and plays.  At the age of seven, she saw her father fight fencing with Walmor Chagas in his backyard, during a Hamlet rehearsal.  She grew up fascinated with the profession.  At 17, after taking the course by Ivan Albuquerque, Rubens Corrêa and Amir Haddad at the Ipanema Theater;  although she moved to two options in the entrance exam - History and Communication;  she chose to pursue a career on stage.

Personal life
From 1987 to 1989 she maintained a conjugal union with the director and photographer Edgar Moura, and from 1991 to 2006 she was married to the French chef and businessman Olivier Anquier.  Together, the couple had two children, born by normal birth, in Rio de Janeiro: Júlia Bloch Anquier, born in 1993, and Hugo Bloch Anquier, born in 1997. Since the beginning of 2018 the actress has lived with her husband, the Portuguese producer  João Nuno Martins in his apartment, in the south of Rio.

In interviews, the actress declared herself to be a feminist and in favor of legalizing abortion, so that poor women have the right to choose what to do with their bodies and their lives in minimal conditions of hygiene and safety.  She also revealed that she had an abortion at the age of twenty, when she became pregnant with her first boyfriend and was starting her artistic career.  She revealed that she never regretted this act, and that the procedure was safe, performed in a private practice of her own gynecologist, and that it was done with her boyfriend's money and consent at the time.

Filmography

Cine

Television

Awards and nominations

APCA Awards

Art Quality Brazil Awards

Best of the Year – Globe Awards

Brasília Film Festival

Cartagena Film Festival

Contigo! Awards

Extra Television Awards

Gramado Film Festival

Grande Otelo

Guarani Film Festival

Press Trophy

Quem Awards

Shell Awards

References

External links

1963 births
Living people
People from Belo Horizonte
Brazilian people of Ukrainian-Jewish descent
Brazilian film actresses
Brazilian telenovela actresses